Light in the Dark or variants may refer to:

Film and TV
The Light in the Dark, 1922 film starring Lon Chaney
"Light in the Dark" (The Legend of Korra), a 2013 episode of The Legend of Korra
Light In The Dark (film), 2019 film by Ekene Som Mekwunye

Music

Albums
Light in the Dark, album by trumpeter Claudio Roditi 2004
Light In The Dark, album by Danetra Moore 2015
A Light in the Dark, album by Metal Church 2006
A Light in the Dark (4 P.M. album), 1997
Lights in the Dark, album by Katie McMahon and Hector Zazou 1998
Light in the Dark (Revolution Saints album), 2017, or the title track

Songs
"Light in the Dark" (Kate Ryan song), 2013
"A Light in the Dark", song by Loudness from Eve to Dawn
"Light In the Dark", song by Fair Warning from Go!
"Light in the Dark", song by John Entwistle from The Rock
"Light in the Dark", song by American heavy metal band Chastain from For Those Who Dare 1990
"Light In The Dark", song by Regine Vasquez from Regine

See also
Light in the Darkness, a 1941 Italian drama film